Bahjoi is a Nagar Palika Parishad city in Sambhal district and division Moradabad, Uttar Pradesh, India. Bahjoi is a headquarter of Sambhal district. Pin code of Bahjoi is 244410. In the past years of its life it was famous for the glass factory during the british colonisation.

Demographics 

In 2011 Bahjoi Nagar Palika Parishad had a total population of 37,037, with 19,168 males and 17,869 females.

Geography
It has an average elevation of 655 metres (1540 feet).

Transport 
Bahjoi is well connected to Sambhal city, New Delhi, Ghaziabad, Moradabad, Budaun, Bareilly, Khair, Bulandshahr, Aligarh, Allahabad, Agra, Kanpur, Mumbai, via train. There is also a railway station.

See also
Dudhapur

References

Cities and towns in Moradabad district